George "Fat" Kitching was an Australian soccer player.

Kitching played one match for Australia in 1938 against India in Brisbane. His granddaughter, Belinda Kitching was also an Australian international soccer player.

Career statistics

International

References

Australian soccer players
Possibly living people
Association football forwards
Year of birth missing
Australia international soccer players